The Tauran Incident, was fought between forces of the Soviet Union, Mongolia, Japan and Manchukuo, during the Soviet-Japanese border conflicts, for control of the Mongolian border village of Tauran.

Timeline
On 11 March, an army of less than 100 Mongolian soldiers with six Soviet advisors invaded the disputed village of Tauran, where they defeated the Manchurian defenders. Later that same day the Imperial Japanese Army with some Manchurian volunteers launched a massive attack to retake the village. The Japanese forces consisted of ten armored vehicles and dozens of warplanes, which bombed the village overnight. The next morning the Japanese launched their ground assault with a force of more than 400 soldiers and a few tanks. The Mongolians were slaughtered and barely did any damage to the Japanese as they were forced to retreat. A quarter of their initial force was killed along with two officers and their commander, Feodor Sokolow. Three Soviet advisors were also killed, creating tensions between both nations.

References

 John Erickson: The Soviet High Command: A Military-political History, 1918-1941, London 1962, p. 415.
 Alvin D. Coox: Nomonhan: Japan Against Russia 1939, Stanford 1985, p. 156/157.

Conflicts in 1936
Battles involving Japan
Battles involving Mongolia
1936 in Mongolia
March 1936 events
Mongolia–Soviet Union relations
Japan–Soviet Union relations
Japan–Mongolia relations
Soviet–Japanese border conflicts